List of hospitals in New Jersey (U.S. state), sorted by hospital name. As of 2014, there were 72 acute care hospitals in the state.

AcuteCare Health System - Specialty Hospital at Kimball, Lakewood
Ancora Psychiatric Hospital, Ancora (Winslow Township)
Ann Klein Forensic Center, Trenton
Astra Health Center, Hoboken
Atlantic Rehabilitation Institute, Morristown
AtlantiCare Regional Medical Center, Atlantic City Campus, Atlantic City
AtlantiCare Regional Medical Center, Mainland Campus, Pomona
Bacharach Institute for Rehabilitation, Pomona
Bayonne Medical Center, Bayonne
Bayshore Community Hospital, Holmdel
Bristol-Myers Squibb Children's Hospital, New Brunswick
Cape Regional Medical Center, Cape May Court House
Capital Health System (Fuld Campus), Trenton
Capital Health System (Mercer Campus), Trenton
Care One at Raritan Bay Medical Center, Perth Amboy
Carrier Clinic, Belle Mead
CentraState Healthcare System, Freehold
Chilton Memorial Hospital, Pompton Plains
Christ Hospital, Jersey City
Christian Health Care Center, Wyckoff
Clara Maass Medical Center, Belleville
Community Medical Center, Toms River
Cooper University Hospital, Camden
Deborah Heart and Lung Center, Browns Mills
East Mountain Hospital, Belle Mead
East Orange General Hospital, East Orange
East Orange VA Medical Center, East Orange
Englewood Hospital and Medical Center, Englewood
Essex County Hospital, Cedar Grove (not to be confused with Overbrook Asylum)
Greystone Park Psychiatric Hospital, Parsippany-Troy Hills
Hackensack University Medical Center, Hackensack
Pascack Valley Medical Center, Westwood
Hackettstown Medical Center, Hackettstown
Hampton Behavioral Health Center, Westampton
HealthSouth - Rehabilitation Hospital of Toms River, Toms River
HealthSouth - Specialty Hospital of Union, Union
Hoboken University Medical Center, Hoboken (formerly St. Mary Hospital)
Holy Name Medical Center, Teaneck
Hudson County Meadowview Hospital, Secaucus
Hunterdon Medical Center, Flemington
Inspira Medical Center Mullica Hill, Mullica Hill
Inspira Medical Center Woodbury, Woodbury
Inspira Medical Center Vineland, Vineland
Inspira Medical Center Elmer, Elmer
Jefferson Cherry Hill Hospital (formerly Kennedy Health)
Jefferson Stratford Hospital (formerly Kennedy Health)
Jefferson Washington Township Hospital (formerly Kennedy Health)
Jersey City Medical Center, Jersey City
Jersey Shore University Medical Center, Neptune Township
JFK Johnson Rehabilitation Institute, Edison
JFK Medical Center, Edison
Kessler Institute for Rehabilitation, Chester Township
Kessler Institute for Rehabilitation, Saddle Brook
Kessler Institute for Rehabilitation, West Orange
Kindred Hospital at Wayne, Wayne
Kindred Hospital at Morris, Dover
Kindred Hospital at Rahway, Rahway
Meadowlands Hospital Medical Center, Secaucus
Meadowview Psychiatric Hospital, Secaucus
Lourdes Medical Center of Burlington County, Willingboro
Lourdes Specialty Hospital, Willingboro
Lyons VA Medical Center, Lyons
Marlton Rehabilitation Hospital, Marlton
Matheny Medical and Educational Center, Peapack
Monmouth Medical Center, Long Branch
Monmouth Medical Center Southern Campus, Lakewood (formerly Kimball Medical Center)
Morristown Medical Center, Morristown
Mountainside Hospital, Glen Ridge
New Bridge Medical Center,  Paramus
Newark Beth Israel Medical Center, Newark
Newton Medical Center, Newton
Ocean Medical Center, Brick
Overlook Medical Center, Summit
Palisades Medical Center, North Bergen
PSE&G Children's Specialized Hospital, New Brunswick
Penn Medicine Princeton Medical Center, Plainsboro
Raritan Bay Medical Center, Perth Amboy
Raritan Bay Medical Center, Old Bridge, Old Bridge
Rehabilitation Hospital of South Jersey, Vineland
The Rehabilitation Hospital of Tinton Falls, Tinton Falls
The Memorial Hospital of Salem County, Salem
Riverview Medical Center, Red Bank
Robert Wood Johnson University Hospital, New Brunswick
Robert Wood Johnson University Hospital Somerset, Somerville
Robert Wood Johnson University Hospital at Rahway, Rahway
Robert Wood Johnson University Hospital at Hamilton, Hamilton
Rutgers - University Behavioral HealthCare, Piscataway
Runnells Specialized Hospital, Berkeley Heights
Saint Barnabas Behavioral Health Center, Toms River
Saint Barnabas Medical Center, Livingston
Saint Clare's Hospital at Boonton Township, Boonton
Saint Clare's Hospital at Denville, Denville
Saint Clare's Hospital at Dover, Dover
Saint Clare's Hospital at Sussex, Sussex
Saint Francis Medical Center, Jersey City
Saint James Hospital, Newark (remains open for psychiatric services only)
Saint Michael's Medical Center, Newark
Saint Peter's University Hospital, New Brunswick
St. Francis Medical Center, Trenton
St. Joseph's Regional Medical Center, Paterson
St. Joseph's Wayne Hospital, Wayne
St. Lawrence Rehabilitation Center, Lawrenceville
St. Mary Hospital, Hoboken – see "Hoboken University Medical Center" (above)
St. Mary's Hospital, Passaic
Select at Belleville, Belleville
Shore Memorial Hospital, Somers Point
Southern Ocean Medical Center, Manahawkin
Specialty Hospital at Monmouth, Long Branch
Summit Oaks Hospital, Summit
Trenton Psychiatric Hospital, West Trenton
Trinitas Hospital, Elizabeth
University Hospital, Newark
The Valley Hospital, Ridgewood
Virtua Mt Holly - Mount Holly
Virtua Berlin - Berlin
Virtua Marlton - Marlton
Virtua Our Lady of Lourdes Medical Center, Camden
Virtua Voorhees - Voorhees
St. Luke's Warren Hospital, Phillipsburg
Weisman Children's Rehabilitation Hospital, Marlton

Former hospitals
All Souls Hospital, Morristown (first general hospital in county established 1891, purchased 1973 by Morristown Memorial Hospital)
Beacon, Jersey City (formerly Jersey City Medical Center)
Barnert Hospital, Paterson
Capital Health System (Mercer Campus), Trenton
Essex County Hospital Center, Cedar Grove (formerly known as Overbrook Asylum) New Essex County Hospital built on Fairview Ave, Cedar Grove
Irvington General Hospital, Irvington
Kenney Memorial Hospital (closed 1953)
Marlboro Psychiatric Hospital, Marlboro (demolished 2015)
Montclair Community Hospital, Montclair (closed 1999, property now town houses)
Muhlenberg Regional Medical Center, Plainfield (closed 2008)
Northern Community Hospital, Oradell (see Riverdell Hospital)
North Hudson Hospital, Weehawken
Orange General Hospital, Orange (a/k/a Hospital Center at Orange)
Palisades Medical Center, North Bergen
Pascack Valley Hospital, Westwood (now Hackensack University Medical Center North at Pascack Valley)
PBI Regional Medical Center, Passaic (now St. Mary's Hospital - Passaic)
Raritan Valley Hospital, Green Brook, New Jersey
Riverdell Hospital, Oradell (closed 1981, demolished 1984)
Senator Garrett W. Hagedorn Psychiatric Hospital, Lebanon Township
South Amboy Medical Center, South Amboy (now medical offices)
Union Hospital, Union (remains open as a satellite emergency department "SLED")
United Hospital Medical Center, Newark (demolished 2015)
United Children's Medical Center, Newark (demolished 2015)
William B. Kessler Memorial Hospital, Hammonton (ER is still in operation via AtlantiCare, however, the rest of the hospital is closed and for sale)

References

External links
NJ Hospital Association Directory
New Jersey Hospitals

New Jersey
 
Hospitals